The 2015 UEC European Track Championships was the sixth edition of the elite UEC European Track Championships in track cycling and took place at the Velodrome Suisse in Grenchen, Switzerland, between 14 and 18 October. The Event was organised by the European Cycling Union. All European champions are awarded the UEC European Champion jersey which may be worn by the champion throughout the year when competing in the same event at other competitions.

The 10 Olympic events (sprint, team sprint, team pursuit, keirin and omnium for men and women), as well as 11 other events are on the program for these European Championships. For the first time, the elimination races, known within track cycling as Devils (from the saying Devil take the hindmost) were contested in their own right.

Participating nations
255 cyclists (98 women,  157 men) from 27 nations enrolled for the championships. The number of entrants per nation is shown in parentheses.

  (3: 3 ♂)
  (2: 1 ♂, 1 ♀)
  (9: 6 ♂, 3 ♀)
  (15: 10 ♂, 5 ♀)
  (3: 3 ♂)
  (13: 11 ♂, 2 ♀)
  (7: 6 ♂, 1 ♀)
  (14: 8 ♂, 6 ♀)
  (4: 2 ♂, 2 ♀)
  (17: 10 ♂, 7 ♀)
  (20: 12 ♂, 8 ♀)
  (1: 1 ♂)
  (20: 12 ♂, 8 ♀)
  (4: 3 ♂, 1 ♀)
  (2: 2 ♂)
  (13: 6 ♂, 7 ♀)
  (16: 8 ♂, 8 ♀)
  (8: 2 ♂, 6 ♀)
  (12: 9 ♂, 3 ♀)
  (3: 2 ♂, 1 ♀)
  (17: 8 ♂, 9 ♀)
  (2: 2 ♂)
  (22: 12 ♂, 10 ♀)
  (10: 8 ♂, 2 ♀) (host)
  (1: 1 ♀)
  (2: 2 ♂)
  (15: 8 ♂, 7 ♀)

Schedule

Schedule only indicating the finals.

Events

Notes 
 Competitors named in italics only participated in rounds prior to the final.
 In the Olympics, all shaded events (except the madison) are contested within the omnium only.
 The madison is not contested in the Olympics.

Medal table

References

External links

Results Tissot timing
Results book
Special information site UEC

 
European Track Championships
European Track Championships
European Track Championships
International cycle races hosted by Switzerland
Grenchen
UEC European Track Championships